Gaggero is a surname. Notable people with the surname include:

 Joseph Gaggero (1927–2012), Gibraltarian businessman
 Jorge Gaggero, Argentinian film director and screenwriter
  (born 1959), businessman